Henry Herman "Harry" Schwartz (May 18, 1869April 24, 1955) was an American politician who served as a U.S. Senator from Wyoming.

Schwartz was born on a farm near Fort Recovery, Ohio, and was educated in the public schools of Mercer County and Cincinnati, Ohio. Schwartz engaged in the newspaper business at Fort Recovery from 1892 to 1894 and at Sioux Falls, South Dakota, from 1894 to 1896. Schwartz studied law, was admitted to the bar in 1895, and commenced practice in Sioux Falls.

Schwartz's political career started in the South Dakota House of Representatives, serving from 1897 to 1899, where he was elected on the Fusion ticket.  He served as chief of the field division of the United States General Land Office at Spokane, Washington, and Helena, Montana, from 1897 to 1907. Schwartz was special assistant to the Attorney General in 1907; and chief of field service, General Land Office in Washington, D.C., from 1907 to 1910.

In 1915, Schwartz moved to Casper, Wyoming, with wife Eliza Bowie Mathews. He served as president of the Casper Board of Education and the Natrona County High School Board from 1928 to 1934. Schwartz was an unsuccessful candidate for election to the United States Senate in 1930, but he served as a member of the Wyoming Senate from 1933 to 1935 and was elected as a Democrat to the United States Senate in 1936 and served from January 3, 1937, to January 3, 1943. He was an unsuccessful candidate for reelection in 1942.

During his term as a U.S. Senator, Harry Schwartz played a key role in opening the door to black military pilots in WWII. In 1939, Public Law 18 appropriated funds to expand pilot training, and Schwartz was able to add an amendment to required some aviation equipment be loaned to schools for the training of black military pilots. When the War Department and the Army Air Corps (AAC) did not follow through on this amendment, Schwartz made visits to General Arnold and others to demand that black pilots be trained.

Also, during his term, Schwartz was chairman of the Committee on Pensions (Seventy-seventh Congress). He was appointed by President Franklin D. Roosevelt to the National Mediation Board, serving from 1943 to 1947. He resumed the practice of law in Casper, Wyoming, until his death there on April 24, 1955. He was interred in Highland Cemetery.

Notes

External links
 
 Official Congressional Directory entry for Wyoming Senator H.H. (Harry) Schwartz
Henry Schwartz's record in the South Dakota State Legislature's Historical Listing
 Cooper, Charlie, Ann Cooper, and Roy La Grone. Tuskegee's heroes: featuring the aviation art of Roy LaGrone. NY, NY: Crestline, 2015.
 

1869 births
1955 deaths
People from Mercer County, Ohio
American people of German descent
Democratic Party United States senators from Wyoming
Democratic Party Wyoming state senators
Democratic Party members of the South Dakota House of Representatives
Politicians from Sioux Falls, South Dakota
Politicians from Casper, Wyoming
Politicians from Helena, Montana